Sheila Eaton Isham (born 1927) is an American printmaker, painter and book artist.

Biography 
Sheila Eaton Isham was born as Sheila Burton Eaton in New York City, New York. She was raised in Cedarhurst and later attended the college preparatory school, Garrison Forest School. 

Isham attended Bryn Mawr College, where she met her future husband Heyward Isham who was attending college at Yale University. After graduating from Byrn Mawr, the couple married. Isham studied at Akademie der Künste in West Berlin (now Academy of Arts, Berlin), between 1950 and 1954. 

In 2004, the State Russian Museum presented a 50-year retrospective of her work. Her work is included in the collections of the Smithsonian American Art Museum, Guild Hall in East Hampton, New York, and the Museum of Modern Art, New York.

References

20th-century American women artists
20th-century American printmakers
Bryn Mawr College alumni
Artists from New York City
People from Cedarhurst, New York
Women book artists
Book artists
American women printmakers
Garrison Forest School people